was a Rear Admiral in the Imperial Japanese Navy during World War II.

Biography
Komura was born in Nakanojo, Gunma prefecture. He graduated from the 45th class of the Imperial Japanese Naval Academy in 1917, ranked 10th in his class of 89 cadets. As midshipman, Komura served on the cruiser  and battleship .

Komura graduated from the Naval Staff College in 1929, and with a promotion to lieutenant commander assumed command of the destroyer , followed by the  two years later. From 1932 to 1934, he was naval attaché to the United Kingdom. After his return to Japan, he served in various staff positions. He was promoted to captain on 15 November 1938.

Komura commanded the cruiser  during the attack on Pearl Harbor on 7 December 1941. Participating in naval operations in the Indian Ocean with the carrier task force, Komura took part in several battles including the Battle of Midway and the Battle of Santa Cruz.

Komura was promoted to rear admiral on 1 November 1943. Appointed chief of staff of the First Task Force, Komura took part in the Battle of the Philippine Sea in June 1944. In October 1944, Komura assumed command of the 1st Carrier Division shortly before the Battle of Leyte Gulf.

On 16 November 1944, the light cruiser  was assigned as the flagship of Rear Admiral Komura's new DesRon 2. On 6 April 1945, Komura received orders for Operation Ten-Go, to attack the American invasion force on Okinawa. Yahagi was ordered to accompany battleship  from Tokushima for its final suicide mission against the American fleet.

At 12:20 on 7 April, the Yamato force was attacked by waves of 386 aircraft (180 fighters, 75 dive bombers, 131 torpedo bombers) from Task Force 58.

At 12:46, a torpedo hit Yahagi directly in her engine room, killing the entire engineering room crew and bringing her to a complete stop. Dead in the water, Yahagi was hit by at least six more torpedoes and 12 bombs by succeeding waves of air attacks. Yahagi capsized and sank at 14:05 at  taking 445 crewmen with her. Komura was among the survivors rescued by the destroyer .

Recalled to Japan in May, Komura was stationed in Tokyo Bay as commanding officer of Yokosuka Naval District until 30 November 1945.

Komura lived on after the war until 1978. He was portrayed by actor Hirotarō Honda in the 2005 Japanese movie Yamato.

References

Further reading

 — First-hand account of the battle by the captain of the Japanese cruiser Yahagi.

 A first-hand account of the battle by Yamatos only surviving bridge officer.

External links

1896 births
1978 deaths
People from Gunma Prefecture
Imperial Japanese Navy admirals
Japanese admirals of World War II